The Ukraine national football team represents Ukraine in men's international football and is governed by the Ukrainian Association of Football, the governing body for football in Ukraine. Ukraine's home ground is the Olimpiyskiy Stadium in Kyiv. The team has been a full member of UEFA and FIFA since 1992.

After Ukrainian Independence and the country's breakaway from the Soviet Union, they played their first match against Hungary on 29 April 1992. The team reached the quarter-finals in the 2006 FIFA World Cup, their debut in the finals of a major championship. Apart from Russia, Ukraine is the only post-Soviet state to qualify for the FIFA World Cup finals.

As the host nation, Ukraine automatically qualified for UEFA Euro 2012. Four years later, Ukraine finished third in their qualifying group for Euro 2016 and advanced via the play-off route to reach a UEFA European Championship tournament through the qualifiers for the first time. This marked the first time in Ukraine's six play-off appearances that it managed to win such a tie, having lost previous play-off ties for the 1998 World Cup, Euro 2000, 2002 World Cup, 2010 World Cup, 2014 World Cup and 2022 World Cup.

Ukraine's best performances in the UEFA European Championship and in the World Cup were in 2020 and 2006 respectively, in both cases reaching the quarter-finals for the first time.

History

Ukrainian SSR (1925–1990)
The national team was formed in the early 1990s and was recognized internationally soon afterwards. It is not widely known, however, that Ukraine previously had a national team in 1925–1935. Just like the Russian Soviet Federative Socialist Republic, the Ukrainian Soviet Socialist Republic had its own national team.

The earliest record of games played by Ukraine can be traced back to August 1928. A championship among the national teams of the Soviet republics as well as the Moscow city team was planned to take place in Moscow; at the All-Soviet tournament, Ukraine reached the final where it lost to Moscow 1–0, after defeating Belarus and Transcaucasus.

In 1929, Ukraine beat Lower Austria in an exhibition match in Kharkiv 4–1, and played in another Soviet tournament. Ukraine lost to Transcaucasus 3–0.

Official formation
Before independence in 1991, Ukrainian players were represented by the Soviet Union national team. After the collapse of the USSR in 1991, Russia took place in the qualifying tournament for the 1994 World Cup. The national team of Ukraine did not manage to enter the tournament on account of it not yet being admitted to FIFA. Meanwhile, some of the best Ukrainian players of the beginning of the 1990s (including Andrei Kanchelskis, Viktor Onopko, Sergei Yuran, Yuriy Nikiforov, Ilya Tsymbalar and Oleg Salenko) chose to play for Russia. At that time  Vyacheslav Koloskov was the only top official from the former Soviet Union and later the Russia who served as a vice-president of UEFA in 1980–1996 and represented  the Soviet Union and later the Commonwealth of Independent States.

The Soviet Union's five-year UEFA coefficient, despite being earned in part by Ukrainian players (for example, in the final of the last successful event, Euro 1988, under the direction of Valery Lobanovsky, 7 out of the 11 starting players were Ukrainians), were transferred to the Russia national team. As a result, a crisis was created for both the national team and the domestic league.

Another reason for the occurred harsh crisis in the Ukrainian football was lack of adequate funding of teams, due to the general economic crisis that has affected all of the CIS countries. There also was a reverse influx of players; Viktor Leonenko agreed on transfer from Dynamo Moscow to Dynamo Kyiv. The Russian club did not want to release him, but Leonenko did not want to continue to play in Moscow.

In the following years, the Ukrainian team improved, showcasing talents like Andriy Shevchenko, Serhiy Rebrov, and Oleksandr Shovkovskyi.

First official games (Prokopenko)
Soon after being accepted to FIFA and UEFA as a full member in 1992, Ukraine selected its first manager by members of a coaching council which consisted of Anatoliy Puzach (manager of Dynamo Kyiv), Yevhen Kucherevskyi (FC Dnipro), Yevhen Lemeshko (Torpedo Zaporizhzhia), Yukhym Shkolnykov (Bukovyna Chernivtsi) and Viktor Prokopenko (Chornomorets Odesa). Later, they were joined by Valeriy Yaremchenko (Shakhtar Donetsk). The circle was narrowed to three specialists; Prokopenko eventually became the manager.

Ukraine played their first match on 29 April 1992 against Hungary in Uzhhorod at the Avanhard Stadium, losing 3–1 with the sole Ukrainian goal scored by Ivan Hetsko. With the creation of "fantom" (transitional) CIS team in place of the Soviet Union playing its own friendly against the England in Moscow in preparation to the UEFA Euro 1992, the Ukrainian team lost some notable players to the that team. Following a couple of losses to Hungary and a tie to United States, Prokopenko resigned and the last season game that year for the national team was led by his assistants Mykola Pavlov and Leonid Tkachenko.

Euro 96 qualification (Bazylevych)

Ukraine appointed another head coach, Oleh Bazylevych, who made his debut with the national team in the spring of 1993 in Odessa during a friendly against Israel, a 1–1 draw. Less than a month later Ukraine finally won, in Vilnius in an away friendly against Lithuania. During the summer they lost 3–1 to Croatia; Ukraine was later seeded in Group 4 of the UEFA Euro 1996 qualification.

Ukraine was defeated by Israel in March 1994, and drew Bulgaria and the United Arab Emirates. On 7 September 1994, the national team started its first official qualification campaign with a surprising home loss 2–0 to Lithuania. Following the defeat and a weak performance in preceding friendlies Bazylevych was fired and on the tour to South Korea the team was led by the Bazylevych assistants Pavlov and Muntyan as a temporary replacement until Federation signs a contract with Valeriy Lobanovsky. on 24 September, the Football Federation of Ukraine appointed Yozhef Sabo as an acting manager until the end of the year after Lobanovsky signed a contract with Kuwait.

With the new manager, their next home game against Slovenia ended goalless and they then beat Estonia 3–0 gaining their first win in official competitive game. At the beginning of the year Football Federation confirmed Anatoliy Konkov as the new head coach on 5 January 1995.

With Konkov the team started with away losses of 4–0 to Croatia and 3–0 to Italy. After that there was a three-game winning streak including a home victory against Croatia and theoretical hopes which were abruptly cut after a loss to Slovenia and the team finished in the fourth place in its first qualification campaign behind Lithuania.

1998–2004: near misses
Following the expiration of a year-long contract with Konkov, in 1996 the Federation appointed Sabo as a head coach and received a preliminary agreement that Lobanovsky will become available following his contract with Kuwait.

Ukraine participated in 1998 World Cup qualification, where the team was drawn into Group 9. Ukraine took second place, only behind Germany and ahead of Portugal but was defeated in a play-off stage 3–1 on aggregate by Croatia. The qualification campaign became notable as the beginning of the international career for Shevchenko as well as more play time for some other players such as Oleksandr Shovkovsky and Serhiy Rebrov.

In UEFA Euro 2000 qualifying, Ukraine, assigned in Group 4, finished above Russia, thanks to an important draw in Moscow and a home victory, but still only qualified for the playoff behind the French side despite being undefeated. Ukraine then fell to Slovenia 3–2 on aggregate. Following the qualification campaign, the Federation finally signed a contract with Valery Lobanovsky, ending Sabo's tenure as a head coach.

The 2002 FIFA World Cup qualification saw Ukraine in Group 5. With Lobanovsky as a head coach, there were expectations of the first qualification to the finals. Yet, Ukraine suffered a home loss to Poland in their opening match, and many draws had resulted in Ukraine qualifying for the playoff again, losing to Germany, 5–2 on aggregate. Under public pressure, particularly the Higher League head coaches who argued that the national team head coach cannot competently serve for both club and national, as well as the health issues of Lobanovsky himself, the Federation decided not to renew a contract with Lobanovsky letting him concentrate on Dynamo Kyiv.

In UEFA Euro 2004 qualifying, Ukraine with the new head coach and another former Dynamo Kyiv star Leonid Buryak was assigned into Group 6, with Spain and Greece. Ukraine failed to qualify.

2006 FIFA World Cup
After Euro 2004 qualifying, Ukraine appointed Oleg Blokhin as the national team's head coach. Seeded at the Group 2 Ukraine went on to qualify as a group winner for their first-ever FIFA World Cup on 3 September 2005 after drawing 1–1 against Georgia in Tbilisi and ahead of Turkey, Denmark and the last campaign rivals Greece among others. This also was the first successful qualification campaign for Ukraine despite a poor home turf performance.

In the 2006 World Cup, they were in the Group H with Spain, Tunisia and Saudi Arabia. After losing 4–0 in the first match against Spain, the Ukrainians won the next two matches to face Switzerland in the round of 16. Tying at 0, Ukraine managed to take Switzerland to a penalty shoot-out where two saves from Oleksandr Shovkovsky secured a positive outcome for his side despite the first kick miss by Andriy Shevchenko. Switzerland which did not lose or yield a single goal was sent home early with Ukraine advancing to the quarterfinals. In the quarterfinals, Ukraine facing Italy was defeated with the second half two goals from Luca Toni securing a comfortable 3–0 win for the future 2006 World Cup champions.

2006–2012
After the World Cup, Ukraine was placed in UEFA Euro 2008 qualifying Group B, along with Italy and France; Ukraine had also performed poorly against Scotland, Georgia and Lithuania, ultimately finishing in fourth place. Due to the bleak performance of the national team Oleg Blokhin resigned and surprisingly signed with the recently established FC Moscow.

With another Soviet football star player Oleksiy Mykhaylychenko as the new head coach, 2010 FIFA World Cup qualification saw Ukraine in Group 6, drawing Croatia and winning against England, sending Ukraine to the playoff. Greece, which had been eliminated by Ukraine in the qualifiers four years earlier, would eventually get revenge. Following the failure to qualify, the Federation decided not to renew the contract with Mykhaylychenko.

As co-hosts, Ukraine qualified automatically for Euro 2012, marking their debut in the UEFA European Championship. The Federation decided to appoint Myron Markevych to prepare and lead the national team in the Euro finals. However, following a few friendlies Markevych resigned due to the off-pitch politics and having held coaching office of both the national team and Metalist Kharkiv. For the next several games in 2010-11 the national team was led by a caretaker Yuriy Kalitvintsev who starred for Ukraine back in its first qualification campaign for the Euro 1996.

On 21 April 2011, Blokhin was again appointed head coach of the Ukraine national team signing a four-year contract. With Blokhin at helm in their opening game against Sweden, Ukraine won 2–1 in Kyiv. In Donetsk, Ukraine was eliminated after a 2–0 loss to France and a 1–0 defeat to England.

2014–present
Seeded at the UEFA Group H Ukraine qualified for yet another playoff after two wins over Poland and two draws over England, where they would play against France. Ukraine beat France at home 2–0 but suffered a 3–0 loss away, thus being eliminated from the 2014 FIFA World Cup. Blokhin who remained a head coach following the home Euro 2012 had to step down due to health concerns in the autumn of 2012 soon after the first home game against England and was replaced by Andriy Bal and later Oleksandr Zavarov. While considering hiring a first foreign specialist, the Federation finally appointed Mykhailo Fomenko as a head coach by end of 2012. Even though Fomenko did not manage to qualify for the World Cup, the Federation decided to retain his services until the end of 2015. With qualification to the Euro 2016, Fomenko was honored to lead the national team in the finals.

With the ongoing Russian aggression, Ukraine in Euro 2016 qualifying was drawn against Spain, Slovakia, Belarus, Macedonia and Luxembourg. Despite having won all matches besides Spain, they finished third due to results against Spain and Slovakia. They defeated Slovenia in the playoff.

Ukraine lost all three games at Euro 2016 without scoring a goal; a 2–0 loss to Germany, a 2–0 loss to Northern Ireland, and Poland 1–0.

Following the Euro 2016, Fomenko was replaced with Andriy Shevchenko as a head coach who served as his assistant during the Euro finals. Seeded in the UEFA Group I, Ukraine started with a home draw to Iceland in 2018 World Cup qualifying and an away draw to Turkey. This was followed by two home wins, 3–0 against Kosovo and 1–0 against Finland. After a 1–0 away loss to Croatia, they beat Finland 2–1 away and Turkey 2–0 at home, they lost 2–0 away to Iceland and won a 2–0 away win against Kosovo. Losing to Croatia at home, they failed to qualify for the playoffs for the first time since UEFA Euro 2008 qualifying and in all its previous FIFA World Cup qualifications.

In the inaugural UEFA Nations League, Ukraine was drawn with Czech Republic and Slovakia in League B. They beat the Czech Republic 2–1 away and Slovakia 1–0 at home, before earning a promotion to League A with a 1–0 home win to the Czech Republic, before ending with a 4–1 away loss to Slovakia.

Ukraine was placed in a group with Euro 2016 title holders Portugal as well as Serbia among other teams. In its opening game of the qualifying campaign Ukraine visited Portugal which was led by returning Cristiano Ronaldo. The match ended 0–0. The second game, against Luxembourg, ended up as a 2–1 win, preceding Ukraine's 5–0 win against Serbia, along with a narrow 1–0 win against Luxembourg. Two matches—away and home against Lithuania (winning 3–0 and 2–0 respectively) saw Ukraine with 16 points and in need of only a point against Portugal. Ukraine won 2–1 and the group before drawing Serbia 2–2.

Ukraine was drawn with Switzerland, Spain, and Germany in the next Nations League. The Ukrainians started their campaign by overcoming Switzerland at home 2–1 to temporarily take first place. However, their next opponent Spain won 4–0. Germany then won 2–1 in Kyiv. Ukraine then defeated Spain for the first time with a 1–0 win. Germany swept Ukraine after a 1–0 deficit was canceled for a 3–1 victory.

As the COVID-19 crisis in Ukraine worsened, eight players from the starting squad tested positive (including one positive SARS-CoV-2 test upon arrival to Lucerne), and as a result, the entire delegation was put into quarantine by the Department of Health of the Canton of Lucerne. Their game against Switzerland away was subsequently cancelled. Ukraine faced relegation if the game was to be awarded 3–0 to Switzerland, or if the result is decided by a drawing of lots and Switzerland was to be handed a 1–0 victory. Eventually, UEFA decided that the match result would be 3–0 in favour of Switzerland, meaning that Ukraine had been officially relegated after just one season in League A.

Ukraine managed to qualify for the knockout stages in the European Championship for the first time in 2020, as one of the best third-placed teams. They beat Sweden 2–1 in the round of 16, after Artem Dovbyk scored the winning goal in the first minute of the second half in extra time. They were then defeated by England in the quarter-final, recording their best finish at a major tournament since 2006.

Ukraine drew 1–1 in both games against France in 2022 World Cup qualifying. Ukraine would then qualify for the playoff after breaking the record set by Australia for the most consecutive draws in World Cup qualification, with five straight draws. After five years and under the spell of draws in the recent campaign, Shevchenko announced his resignation in August 2021 and was replaced with Oleksandr Petrakov who recently led the Ukraine U-20 team to the World Cup victory. Ukraine eventually picked up a much-needed victory over Finland, ending their run of draws and giving them a two-point lead over Bosnia and a three-point lead over Finland. However, both Bosnia and Finland had a game in hand over Ukraine, who managed to qualify for the playoffs after a 2–0 win over Bosnia and a Finnish loss to France. Ukraine faced Scotland in the Group A playoff semifinals, postponed in March 2022 to June after Russia invaded the country in February, winning 3–1 at Hampden Park, but ultimately losing 1–0 to Wales in an emotional playoff final at the Cardiff City Stadium.

Stadiums

Most matches are held at Kyiv's Olimpiyskyi National Sports Complex.

During the Soviet era (before 1991), only three stadiums in Ukraine were used in official games, the Olimpiysky NSC in Kyiv (known then as Republican Stadium), the predecessor of Chornomorets, BSS Central Stadium in Odesa, and the Lokomotiv Stadium in Simferopol.

Since May 2022, due to the Russian invasion of Ukraine, home game matches have been taking place in Łódź.

Home venue record

Since Ukraine's first fixture (29 April 1992 vs. Hungary) they have played their home games at 11 different stadiums. 

Last updated: 11 November 2021. Statistics include official FIFA-recognised matches only.

Kits and sponsors

Kit history and evolution
 
On 29 March 2010, Ukraine debuted a new Adidas kit. This replaced the Adidas kit with a yellow base and the traditional Adidas three stripe with a snake sash which was used in 2009.
Before 5 February 2009 Ukraine wore a Lotto kit. In 2009 the official team kit was produced by German company Adidas which has a contract with the Ukrainian team until 31 December 2016. Joma manufactured the kits starting in the year 2017 for the match against Croatia on 24 March 2017.

Sponsors
Marketing for the Football Federation of Ukraine is conducted by the Ukraine Football International (UFI).
 Title sponsor: Epicentr (since 2013)
 Premium (General) sponsors: Chernihivske (since 1998)
 Official sponsors: Henkel (Ukraine), Adidas, Airline "MAU" (Ukraine International Airlines), NIKO (official Mitsubishi distributor in Ukraine), Boris clinic, Tour agency "Love Cyprus", Resort center "Grand Admiral Club"

Former title and general sponsors included Ukrtelecom, Kyivstar, Nordex (Austria), and Geoton.

Results and fixtures

The following matches were played or are scheduled to be played by the national team in the current or upcoming seasons.

2022

2023

Coaching staff
Currently approved:

Coaching history

Players

Current squad
The following players were called up for the UEFA Euro 2024 qualifying match against England on 26 March 2023.

Caps and goals updated as of 27 September 2022, after the match against Scotland.

Recent call-ups
The following players have been called up for the team within the last 12 months.

Notes
U21 = Was called up from national U21 squad.
WD = Player withdrew from the squad due to non-injury issue.
INJ = It is not part of the current squad due to injury.
RES = Reserves squad – replaces a member of the squad in case of injury/unavailability.
RET = Retired from the national team.
PRE = Preliminary squad/standby.

Previous squads
2006 FIFA World Cup squad
UEFA Euro 2012 squad
UEFA Euro 2016 squad
UEFA Euro 2020 squad

Player records

Players in bold are still active with Ukraine.

Most capped players

Top goalscorers

Most capped goalkeepers

Captains

Competitive record

FIFA World Cup

 Champions   Runners-up   Third place   Fourth place  

* Denotes draws include knock-out matches decided on penalty kicks.

UEFA European Championship

 Champions   Runners-up   Third place   Fourth place

UEFA Nations League

Head-to-head record

The following table shows Ukraine's all-time international record, correct as of 27 September 2022.

FIFA Ranking history

See also

Ukraine national under-21 football team
Ukraine national under-19 football team
Ukraine national under-18 football team
Ukraine national under-17 football team
Ukraine national under-16 football team
Ukrainians on the Soviet Union national football team

Notes

References

External links

Official website of the Ukrainian Association of Football
Ukrainian page on FIFA's website
Ukrainian page on UEFA's website
Ukrainian Soccer History website 
Ukrainian Football
Soccerway Profile
National Team Roster and Match History
RSSSF archive of most capped players and highest goalscorers
Media library of Ukrainian National Football Team
ELO ratings
List of Ukrainian international players perished in car crashes
Ukraine Football International website
Complete List of Teams and Results

 
European national association football teams
Football teams in Ukraine
Ukrainian Association of Football
Institutions with the title of National in Ukraine